This is a list of rural localities in Tver Oblast. Tver Oblast (Tverskaya oblast) is a federal subject of Russia (an oblast). Its administrative center is the city of Tver. From 1935 to 1990, it was known as Kalinin Oblast, named after Mikhail Kalinin. Population: 1,353,392 (2010 Census).

Andreapolsky District 
Rural localities in Andreapolsky District:

 Abakanovo

Bezhetsky District 
Rural localities in Bezhetsky District:

 Bormino
 Gryada
 Kulovo
 Lyubini
 Potyosy

Bologovsky District 
Rural localities in Bologovsky District:

 Lykoshino

Firovsky District 
Rural localities in Firovsky District:

 Komkino

Kalininsky District 
Rural localities in Kalininsky District:

 Avvakumovo
 Mednoye
 Tukhin

Kalyazinsky District 
Rural localities in Kalyazinsky District:

 Sknyatino

Kashinsky District 
Rural localities in Kashinsky District:

 Buzykovo
 Miloslavskoye
 Yurino
 Zlobino

Konakovsky District 
Rural localities in Konakovsky District:

 1st May
 Zavidovo

Krasnokholmsky District 
Rural localities in Krasnokholmsky District:

 Mashino

Kuvshinovsky District 
Rural localities in Kuvshinovsky District:

 Novo

Lesnoy District 
Rural localities in Lesnoy District:

 Lesnoye
 Viglino

Likhoslavlsky District 
Rural localities in Likhoslavlsky District:

 Pervitino

Maksatikhinsky District 
Rural localities in Maksatikhinsky District:

 Kostretsy

Molokovsky District 
Rural localities in Molokovsky District:

 Kosovo

Oleninsky District 
Rural localities in Oleninsky District:

 Uleyki

Ostashkovsky District 
Rural localities in Ostashkovsky District:

 Ivanova Gora

Penovsky District 
Rural localities in Penovsky District:

 Moskva

Rameshkovsky District 
Rural localities in Rameshkovsky District:

 Lavrovo
 Vilovo

Rzhevsky District 
Rural localities in Rzhevsky District:

 Mologino

Sandovsky District 
Rural localities in Sandovsky District:

 Lvovskoye
 Ustrovka

Torzhoksky District 
Rural localities in Torzhoksky District:

 Ilyino

Udomelsky District 
Rural localities in Udomelsky District:

 Brusovo
 Ozyora
 Svirka

Vesyegonsky District 
Rural localities in Vesyegonsky District:

 Badachyovo
 Borshchevo
 Chistaya Dubrova
 Kesma
 Yogna

Vyshnevolotsky District 
Rural localities in Vyshnevolotsky District:

 Mazovo

Zharkovsky District 
Rural localities in Zharkovsky District:

 Kamino

See also
 
 Lists of rural localities in Russia

References

Tver Oblast